David Montalba, FAIA, SIA, LEED AP (born 1972 in Florence, Italy) is a Swiss-American architect based in Santa Monica, California. He is the founding principal of Montalba Architects, established in 2004.

Early life and education
Montalba was born in Florence, Italy and raised in both Lausanne, Switzerland and Carmel and San Diego, California. He attend Southern California Institute of Architecture (SCI-Arc) where he earned his Bachelor of Architecture in 1996 and completed his Master of Architecture at UCLA in 2000.

Career
Upon graduating from UCLA, he started his career with Fehlman Labarre Architects and has worked with design driven practices in Los Angeles including Frank Gehry, Rios Associates, and Pugh Scarpa, before establishing Santa Monica-based Montalba Architects, Inc. in 2004. He is also an adjunct professor at UCLA's Graduate School of Architecture.

He has served as a Board Member and Treasurer of the Los Angeles chapter of the American Institute of Architects and an advisor to the AIA's Academic Outreach and 2x8 Exhibition Committees. David has also served as a Board Member of the A+D Museum in Los Angeles and a registered member of NCARB.

Awards and recognition
Montalba has received 30 awards from the notable American Institute of Architect (AIA) including the 2008 National Young Architect Award, Institute Honor Award in 2011 and 2019, 2013 AIA LA Presidential Honor Award for Building Team of the Year and in 2016, he was elevated to the College of the Fellows of the AIA. He was named one of the Top 20 Under 40 winners by ENR California in 2012 and listed as one of the 40 Under 40 architects by Building Design + Construction in 2012. In 2020, AN Interior named him one of the Top 50 Architects of the year.

Selected projects

Hospitality
 SOHO House - Malibu, California
 Nobu Hotel Palo Alto - Palo Alto, California 
 Whitepod, Zen Suite – Monthey, Switzerland  
 Whitepod Suites-Chalets – Monthey, Switzerland
 Nobu Ryokan - Malibu, California
 Nobu Malibu - Malibu, California
 Equinox - Vancouver, British Columbia
 Equinox, Huntington Beach – Huntington Beach, California

Commercial
 Headspace SM Campus - Santa Monica, California
 Sony Music Headquarters – Beverly Hills, California
 Tom Bradley International Terminal – LA Airport - Los Angeles, California

Retail
 The Row Melrose – West Hollywood, California
 Monique Lhuillier – New York City, New York
 Carolina Herrera – Beverly Hills, California
 Gabriele Colangelo – Beijing, China

References 

Living people
University of California alumni
Swiss architects
University of California, Los Angeles alumni
1972 births